The Willink Baronetcy, of Dingle Bank in the City of Liverpool, is a title in the Baronetage of the United Kingdom. It was created on 20 July 1957 for the Conservative politician and public servant Henry Willink. He served as Minister of Health from 1943 to 1945. As of 2010 the title is held by his grandson, the third Baronet, who succeeded in 2009.

Willink baronets, of Dingle Bank (1957)
Sir Henry Urmston Willink, 1st Baronet (1894–1973)
Sir Charles William Willink, 2nd Baronet (1929–2009)
Sir Edward Daniel Willink, 3rd Baronet (born 1957)

Notes

References
Kidd, Charles, Williamson, David (editors). Debrett's Peerage and Baronetage (1990 edition). New York: St Martin's Press, 1990, 

Willink